The 1996 European Athletics Indoor Championships were held at the Globe Arena, Stockholm, the capital city of Sweden from Friday, 8 March to Sunday, 10 March 1996.

This was the first edition to feature women's pole vault.

Medal summary

Men

Women

Medal table

Participating nations

 (1)
 (1)
 (2)
 (9)
 (9)
 (7)
 (1)
 (15)
 (3)
 (5)
 (18)
 (4)
 (8)
 (7)
 (37)
 (1)
 (33)
 (25)
 (24)
 (7)
 (4)
 (3)
 (12)
 (23)
 (8)
 (4)
 (2)
 (2)
 (5)
 (6)
 (8)
 (12)
 (7)
 (18)
 (33)
 (1)
 (2)
 (11)
 (28)
 (23)
 (8)
 (7)
 (15)
 (4)

References

 
European Athletics Indoor Championships
European Indoor Championships
International athletics competitions hosted by Sweden
1996 in Swedish sport
March 1996 sports events in Europe
International sports competitions in Stockholm
1990s in Stockholm